Dennie Moore (born Florence Moore; December 30, 1902 – February 22, 1978) was an American film and stage actress.

Early life 
Moore was born in New York City on December 30, 1902, to immigrant parents of Scottish and Irish descent. She was raised in Hell's Kitchen in Manhattan. Her brother, Joe Moore, was an Olympic champion speed skater, and she had two step-sisters and one step-brother. She received six years of schooling.

Career 
In the late 1920s, she decided to pursue an acting career, using the name Dennie Moore to avoid confusion with the actress Florence Moore. Starting in 1927, she appeared on Broadway in such plays as A Lady in Love, The Trial of Mary Dugan, Cross Roads, Torch Song, Twentieth Century, Phantoms, Conflict, Anatol, and Jarnegan. She also appeared in productions in Chicago, Illinois and London, England.

In 1935, Moore arrived in Hollywood and made her screen debut in an uncredited but substantial role in the Cary Grant-Katharine Hepburn film, Sylvia Scarlett for RKO Radio Pictures. She was primarily a freelance actress and floated between Metro-Goldwyn-Mayer and Warner Bros. Studios. In the course of her film career, she appeared in twenty-two films between 1935 and 1951, including Boy Meets Girl (1938), The Women (1939), Saturday's Children (1940), Dive Bomber (1941), and Anna Lucasta (1949).

By the mid-1940s, Moore found herself getting less work in Hollywood, but more parts on the New York stage. In 1951, she made her last screen appearance as Mrs. Bea Gingras in The Model and the Marriage Broker. Moving back to New York City, she made one final performance onstage, creating the role of Mrs. Van Daan in The Diary of Anne Frank. In 1957, she retired from acting at the age of 55.

Later life and death 
Moore was a Catholic and a Democrat who supported Adlai Stevenson's campaign during the 1952 presidential election.

In 1977, David Ragan wrote in Who's Who in Hollywood that Moore "is retired, lives alone at an excellent hotel on Park Avenue, and is in her late 60s".

Moore died of natural causes at age 75 on February 22, 1978, in her Manhattan apartment. She left no immediate survivors. She was cremated and her ashes scattered off her balcony.

Stage appearances 

 A Lady in Love (1927)
 The Trial of Mary Dugan (1927)
 Jarnegan (1928–1929)
 Conflict (1929)
 Cross Roads (1929)
 Phantoms (1930)
 Torch Song (1930)
 Anatol (1931)
 East Wind (1931)
 The Man Who Reclaimed His Head (1932)
 The Great Magoo (1932)
 Twentieth Century (1932–1933)
 Man Bites Dog (1933)
 The Pursuit of Happiness (1933–1934)
 Say When (1934–1935)
 Swing Your Lady (1936–1937)
 Hitch Your Wagon (1937)
 In Clover (1937)
 Ah, Wilderness! (1941)
 Johnny on a Spot (1942)
 Over 21 (1944)
 Seven Lively Arts (1944–1945)
 Star-Spangled Family (1945)
 The Rat Race (1949–1950)
 The Diary of Anne Frank (1955–1957)

Filmography

References

External links 

 1940 US census, with "Florence D. Moore" listing, and age given as 36, familysearch.org; accessed March 30, 2015.
 
 

1902 births
1978 deaths
20th-century American actresses
Actresses from New York City
American film actresses
American stage actresses
American people of Irish descent
American people of Scottish descent
American Roman Catholics
New York (state) Democrats
California Democrats